The 2022 Mahindra ROXOR 200 was the 11th stock car race of the 2022 NASCAR Xfinity Series season, and the 35th iteration of the event. The race was held on May 7, 2022, in Darlington, South Carolina at Darlington Raceway, a 1.366-mile (2.198 km) egg-shaped oval. It was contested over 147 laps. At race's end, Justin Allgaier of JR Motorsports would take the win, after taking the lead on the final restart. He would also lead the most laps.
This was Allgaier's 17th career Xfinity Series win, and his first of the season. To fill out the podium, Noah Gragson of JR Motorsports and Riley Herbst of Stewart-Haas Racing would finish 2nd and 3rd, respectively.

Report

Background

Darlington Raceway is a race track built for NASCAR racing located near Darlington, South Carolina. It is nicknamed "The Lady in Black" and "The Track Too Tough to Tame" by many NASCAR fans and drivers and advertised as "A NASCAR Tradition." It is of a unique, somewhat egg-shaped design, an oval with the ends of very different configurations, a condition which supposedly arose from the proximity of one end of the track to a minnow pond the owner refused to relocate. This situation makes it very challenging for the crews to set up their cars' handling in a way that is effective at both ends.

First held in 1982, the spring Darlington race ran from 1984 to 2014 before returning to the Xfinity Series schedule in 2020. On December 11, Darlington Raceway announced its highly popular NASCAR Throwback weekend would move to the new May 7-9 weekend, effectively making a lineal swap of the two race meetings at the track.

Entry list 
 (R) denotes rookie driver.
 (i) denotes driver who are ineligible for series driver points.

Practice 
The only 30-minute practice session was held on Friday, May 6, at 5:00 PM EST.

Qualifying 
Qualifying was scheduled to be held on Friday, May 6, at 5:30 PM EST, but was canceled due to inclement weather. The starting lineup would be determined by a performance-based metric system. As a result, Ty Gibbs of Joe Gibbs Racing won the pole. Chase Elliott and Brennan Poole would fail to qualify.

Race results 
Stage One Laps: 45

Stage Two Laps: 45

Stage Three Laps: 57

Standings after the race 

Drivers' Championship standings

Note: Only the first 12 positions are included for the driver standings.

References

Mahindra ROXOR 200
Mahindra ROXOR 200
NASCAR races at Darlington Raceway
Mahindra ROXOR 200